Izbishche is a rural locality (a selo) in Nizhnevedugskoye Rural Settlement, Semiluksky District, Voronezh Oblast, Russia. The population was 119 as of 2010. There are 7 streets.

Geography 
Izbishche is located 49 km west of Semiluki (the district's administrative centre) by road. Andreyevka is the nearest rural locality.

References 

Rural localities in Semiluksky District